Khosro Nezafatdoust is an Iranian wrestler. He competed at the 1974 Asian Games and won a silver medal.

References

Living people
Iranian male sport wrestlers
Place of birth missing (living people)
Asian Games silver medalists for Iran
Asian Games medalists in wrestling
Wrestlers at the 1974 Asian Games
Medalists at the 1974 Asian Games
Year of birth missing (living people)
20th-century Iranian people